Discovery Family was a French family-oriented specialty television channel owned by Discovery, Inc. which launched on 14 September 2017. The channel was available exclusively to SFR TV subscribers, as a part of a deal between SFR and Discovery.

Unlike the American counterpart, the channel does not include programming aimed at children.

References

 https://www.broadbandtvnews.com/2016/12/09/altice-signs-exclusive-discovery-nbcuniversal-deals/
 https://www.eurocomms.com/industry-news/12000-altice-boosts-sfr-tv-offer-with-nbcuniversal-and-discovery-deals
 http://www.digitaltveurope.net/638731/altice-takes-on-canal-with-exclusive-nbcu-discovery-deals-and-new-premium-channel/
 http://www.lettreaudiovisuel.com/discovery-family-sinstalle-sur-le-bouquet-sfr/
 http://www.programme-tv.net/news/tv/160461-la-nouvelle-chaine-discovery-family-debarque-le-14-septembre-prochain-sur-sfr/
 https://www.megazap.fr/Discovery-Family-La-nouvelle-chaine-familiale-exclusive-de-SFR_a2885.html

External links
 

Warner Bros. Discovery networks
Television stations in France
Defunct television channels in France
Television channels and stations established in 2017
Television channels and stations disestablished in 2022
2017 establishments in France
2022 disestablishments in France
Warner Bros. Discovery EMEA